Triantha occidentalis, the western false asphodel, is a species of carnivorous flowering plant in the family Tofieldiaceae. It is found in the Pacific Northwest.

Botanical history
Triantha occidentalis was described by Sereno Watson in 1879 as Tofieldia occidentalis, and reassigned to Triantha by R. R. Gates in 1918. The carnivorous behavior of the plant was discovered in 2021 by a group of scientists from the University of British Columbia and the University of Wisconsin–Madison.

Range
The native range of Triantha occidentalis is from Southeast Alaska to Central California. The range includes the US states of Alaska, California, Idaho, Montana, Oregon, Washington, and Wyoming and the Canadian provinces of Alberta and British Columbia.

Carnivory
Triantha occidentalis is a carnivorous plant; the flower stems are covered in a sticky substance, and have tiny hairs that produce a digestive enzyme, a phosphatase. The sticky substance is able to trap small insects, which are digested by the enzyme from the hairs, allowing the plant to absorb their nutrients. Other carnivorous plants have insect traps well away from flowers, in positions where pollinating insect such as bees and butterflies are nor affected; T. occidentalis'''s sticky flower stems are only able to trap smaller insects such as fruit flies. It was not suspected that T. occidentalis, which grows near urban centers, was carnivorous until it was found to have a genetic deletion sometimes seen in carnivorous plants, prompting investigation. The plant is,  the only one known to trap insects this unsuspected way, but it has been suggested that there may be more.

Subspecies
The following subspecies are accepted:Triantha occidentalis subsp. brevistyla (C.L.Hitchc.) PackerTriantha occidentalis subsp. montana (C.L.Hitchc.) PackerTriantha occidentalis subsp. occidentalis''

References

Tofieldiaceae
Carnivorous plants
Flora of Alaska
Flora of British Columbia
Flora of Alberta
Flora of Washington (state)
Flora of Idaho
Flora of Montana
Flora of Oregon
Flora of Wyoming
Plants described in 1918
Flora without expected TNC conservation status